Extra Terrestrial Visitors (original title Los nuevos extraterrestres, literally The New Extraterrestrials) is a 1983 French-Spanish science fiction film directed by Juan Piquer Simón. The film's original draft was meant to be a straightforward horror film about an evil alien on a murderous rampage, but the producers demanded script alterations in order to cash in on the success of Steven Spielberg's E.T. the Extra-Terrestrial by featuring a child and a cute, lovable alien.

The film was largely forgotten until 1991, when it was lampooned by B movie-mocking cult TV series Mystery Science Theater 3000, which used a print by Film Ventures International in which the film was re-titled Pod People.

Plot
The film starts with three poachers going into the woods to hunt. One of them sees what he thinks is a meteor land and goes to investigate.  He finds a red glowing cave with a stash of large eggs. He decides to smash them, but is killed by an unseen entity before he can finish, which leaves one egg left intact. The mysterious being takes revenge for the destruction, first killing the other hunters and then going after members of a rock band led by Rick (Ian Sera), who are on a weekend camping trip. This band is accompanied by Laura, a girl who Rick met and told about the weekend's plans, not expecting her to want to come along. Sharon, a member of the band, is jealous of Laura, as she (Sharon) is Rick's girlfriend. Cathy and Tracy are also band members.

Tommy (Óscar Martín) is a young boy living in a secluded house with his mother Molly (Concha Cuetos) and his short-tempered uncle Bill (Manuel Pereiro). He also finds the cave, and brings the remaining egg home where it hatches. The creature from the egg grows rapidly overnight until it is as large as Tommy. Tommy nicknames it "Trumpy" because he has a short, trumpet-like trunk. Tommy and Trumpy quickly become playmates. At one point, Tommy asks Trumpy where he is from. Trumpy indicates a star map, which for some reason features the Big Dipper prominently. It also becomes clear that Trumpy has developed telekinetic powers around this time, as it flings various objects around Tommy's room. While the mother alien continues to look for her missing offspring, the rock band stops at Tommy's house for medical care after Laura encounters the alien mother and falls off of a cliff, later dying in the house. A strange dot formation (similar to the Big Dipper) is later seen on her forehead.

Rick's friend Brian (Emilio Linder) and uncle Bill go to a nearby ranger station to use the radio. There they stumble on the alien mother, as well as the body of a second poacher, which also bears the dot pattern. The alien kills Brian while Bill flees to the cabin. The alien beats him home, however, and kills band-member Tracy in the band's camper. Tommy witnesses the attack through his telescope. The survivors decide to hole up in the cabin until the next day.

Trumpy's mother sneaks into the house and kills Cathy while she is taking a shower. The survivors attempt too late to come to her rescue when they hear Cathy screaming, and Bill manages to wound the alien with a wild shot. Bill and Rick want to catch Trumpy's mother before she can escape, so Rick takes a rifle and they go in pursuit.

Immediately after they leave, Trumpy appears, scaring Molly and Sharon. Molly grabs a rifle and aims to shoot Trumpy, but Tommy protects his alien friend and hustles Trumpy into the woods.  Molly and Sharon give chase, searching for Tommy, Rick, and Bill in the gloom.

Eventually Trumpy and his mother reunite briefly before Rick and Bill find them.  The alien mother attacks Bill, who shoots her once before being killed, then she is gunned down by Rick.  Trumpy and Tommy disappear in the woods and say their goodbyes before Tommy reunites with his mother, Sharon, and Rick. The movie ends with Trumpy moving deeper into the woods and Tommy, Rick, Molly, and Sharon heading back to the cabin.

Mystery Science Theater 3000
The film features the fictional pop band's performance of "Burning Rubber Tires," which was lampooned in a sketch on Mystery Science Theater 3000 for its unintelligible lyrics, specifically the chorus, "hear the engines roar now" which was interpreted by the MST3K cast as "hideous control now," "idiot control now," and other variations. The lead singer's after-song gesture of making the OK sign, smiling, and saying, "It stinks" became a recurring in-joke on MST3K.

Legacy
The film was distributed in the U.S. by Film Ventures International. In common with Cave Dwellers, another Film Ventures release spoofed by MST3K, the opening and ending credits for "Pod People" are superimposed over blurred footage from an entirely unrelated movie, in this case The Galaxy Invader (1985). The latter film would later be spoofed by Mike Nelson, Bill Corbett, and Kevin Murphy for RiffTrax in 2011.  It was selected by fans to be in the MST3K 2016 and 2020 Turkey Day Marathon.

DVD releases 
The MST3K version of the film was released by Rhino Home Video as part of the Collection, Volume 2 DVD set which was re-released by Shout Factory. The film itself has been released on DVD by Televista.

External links 
 

MST3K episode on ShoutFactoryTV

References

1983 films
1980s science fiction films
E.T. the Extra-Terrestrial
Films directed by Juan Piquer Simon
Films set in the United States
Films shot in Madrid
Mockbuster films
1980s Spanish-language films
Spanish science fiction films
1980s rediscovered films